Adham Hatem Elgamal (born 4 February 1998) is an Egyptian badminton player. He won the mixed doubles title at the 2020 African Championships together with his partner Doha Hany. Elgamal competed at the 2019 African Games, won a silver in the mixed doubles, and two bronze medals in the team and men's doubles events. He also participated at the 2018 Mediterranean Games, and at the 2020 Summer Olympics.

Achievements

African Games 
Men's doubles

Mixed doubles

African Championships 
Men's singles

Men's doubles

Mixed doubles

Arab Championships 
Mixed doubles

BWF International Challenge/Series (8 titles, 12 runners-up) 
Men's singles

Men's doubles

Mixed doubles

  BWF International Challenge tournament
  BWF International Series tournament
  BWF Future Series tournament

References

External links 
 
 
 
 

1998 births
Living people
Sportspeople from Cairo
Egyptian male badminton players
Badminton players at the 2020 Summer Olympics
Olympic badminton players of Egypt
Competitors at the 2019 African Games
African Games silver medalists for Egypt
African Games bronze medalists for Egypt
African Games medalists in badminton
Competitors at the 2018 Mediterranean Games
Competitors at the 2022 Mediterranean Games
Mediterranean Games competitors for Egypt
21st-century Egyptian people